Il gatto (internationally released as The Cat) is a 1977 Italian giallo-comedy film directed by Luigi Comencini. For this film, Mariangela Melato was awarded with a David di Donatello for Best Actress.

Plot
Amedeo Pegoraro (Ugo Tognazzi) and his sister Ofelia (Mariangela Melato) are the greedy dual landlords of a run-down apartment building with few tenants left. The siblings are constantly fighting. Due to a real estate company offering one billion lira for the building on the condition that it has no tenants, Amedeo and Ofelia harass and spy on their tenants to goad them into leaving, or find justification to evict them. Amedeo is drawn to, but refuses the advances of, Wanda Yukovich (Dalila Di Lazzaro), a young and attractive secretary who works for Legrand (Jean Martin), a corrupt businessman. Amedeo and Ofelia find their pet cat dead, which was disliked by many tenants for its mischief. The siblings begin to investigate the death of the cat, hoping to evict the culprit; meanwhile, Police Commissioner Francisci (Michel Galabru) becomes more and more exasperated by their antics.

Amedeo suspects The Princess (Adriana Innocenti) due to gunshots being fired at the cat and her being experienced with firearms; after reporting this to the police, her apartment is raided and revealed to be an illegal brothel. After no gunshot wounds are found on the cat's body, Amedeo searches the apartment of a group of musicians while Ofelia unsuccessfully tries to seduce the priest Don Pezzolla (Philippe Leroy). After discovering cocaine, Amedeo reports the musicians to the Guardia di Finanza, leading to their arrest for drug trafficking.

While investigating the apartment of Don Vito Garofalo, a mafia boss, Amedeo discovers bloodstains, and he and Ofelia follow two suspicious men who were in the apartment. After finding a corpse in the trunk of the two men's car, the siblings follow them to a beachfront home owned by a male politician who was in a relationship with Salvatore (Aldo Reggiani), Don Garofalo's gay butler. There, the two men dump Salvatore's body, attempting to frame the murder as a crime of passion. Ofelia writes anonymous threatening letters to the remaining tenants that state that 'we know your secret', which is seen as an empty threat by most of the tenants, but Paul Herdigher, an American journalist, takes it seriously and commits suicide. Ofelia discovers that the cat was poisoned by Wanda, and confronts her at work, only for Legrand to attempt to bribe the siblings to drop the case. Instead of accepting the bribe, Ofelia gives her testimony in the trial of Legrand. Ofelia explains to the court that the cat was poisoned as Wanda fed her dinner to it as she had suspected someone had poisoned her food, as she had incriminating recordings of Don Garofalo and Legrand.

Don Garofalo sends an assassin to kill Wanda, who eludes him and attempts to flee the country, Amedeo follows her, and receives the incriminating tapes from her. After the tapes are played in court, Don Garofalo is immediately arrested. Don Pezzolla moves out of his apartment after Ofelia writes obscene letters to the Bishop about Don Pezzola, and he gets transferred elsewhere as a result. With all tenants out of the building, the siblings return to the real estate company's lawyer to receive their money, only for Wanda to return to live in her apartment, and the lawyer promptly rips up their checks.

Cast 
Ugo Tognazzi: Amedeo Pegoraro
Mariangela Melato: Ofelia Pegoraro, sister of Amedeo
Michel Galabru: Commissioner Francisci
Dalila Di Lazzaro: Wanda Yukovich
Jean Martin: Legrand
Aldo Reggiani: Salvatore
Philippe Leroy: Don Pezzolla
Adriana Innocenti: The Princess
Bruno Gambarotta: Lawyer
Luigi Comencini: Old violinist
Mario Brega: Killer

References

External links

1977 films
Commedia all'italiana
Films directed by Luigi Comencini
Italian comedy films
Films set in Rome
Giallo films
Films scored by Ennio Morricone
1977 comedy films
Sergio Leone
Italian LGBT-related films
1970s Italian films